Dejan Dimov (born April 20, 1974) is a Macedonian former professional basketball player who played for MZT Skopje Aerodrom.

External links

References

1974 births
Living people
KK MZT Skopje players
Macedonian men's basketball players
Sportspeople from Skopje
Small forwards
Shooting guards